Mulled wine, also known as spiced wine, is an alcoholic drink usually made with red wine, along with various mulling spices and sometimes raisins, served hot or warm. It is a traditional drink during winter, especially around Christmas. It is usually served at Christmas markets in Europe, primarily in Germany and eastern France. There are non-alcoholic versions of it. Vodka-spiked mulled wine can be found in Polish Christmas markets, where mulled wine is commonly used as a mixer.

Origins 

The first record of wine being spiced and heated can be found in Plautus's play Curculio, written during the 2nd century BC. The Romans travelled across Europe, conquering much of it and trading with the rest. The legions brought wine and viticulture with them up to the Rhine and Danube rivers and to the Scottish border, along with their recipes.

The Forme of Cury, a medieval English cookery book from 1390, which mentioned mulled wine, says: "Pur fait Ypocras ..." grinding together cinnamon, ginger, galangal, cloves, long pepper, nutmeg, marjoram, cardamom, and grains of paradise ("spykenard de Spayn", rosemary may be substituted). This is mixed with red wine and sugar (form and quantity unstated).

Britain 
Mulled wine is very popular and traditional in the United Kingdom at Christmas, and less commonly throughout winter. Mulled cider (and sometimes mulled ale, traditional yet no longer common) is also served, with a mulled apple juice as a non-alcoholic alternative.

In traditional culture

Over the years the recipe for mulled wine has evolved with the tastes and fashions of the time. One Victorian example of this is smoking bishop, mentioned by Charles Dickens but no longer drunk or known in modern culture. A more traditional recipe can be found in Mrs. Beeton's Book of Household Management at paragraph 1961 on page 929 to 930 of the revised edition dated 1869:

In contemporary culture

In contemporary British culture, there is no specific recipe for mulled wine and the spices involved in its recipe. It is commonly a combination of orange, lemon, cinnamon, nutmeg, fennel seed (or star anise), cloves, cardamom, and ginger. The spices may be combined and boiled in a sugar syrup before red wine is added, heated, and served. Variations include adding brandy or ginger wine. A tea bag of spices can be added to the wine, which is heated along with slices of orange as a convenient alternative to a full recipe. Mulled wine is often served in small (200 ml) porcelain or glass mugs, sometimes with an orange slice garnish studded with cloves.

Mulled wine and ales infused with mulling spices are available in the UK in the winter months. Wassail punch is a warm mulled beer or cider drunk in winter in Victorian times.

Glühwein 

Glühwein (roughly translated as "smouldering-wine", from the temperature the wine is heated to) is popular in German-speaking countries and in the Alsace region of France. It is a traditional beverage offered during the Christmas holidays. In Alsace Christmas markets, it is traditionally the only alcoholic beverage served. The oldest documented Glühwein tankard is attributed to Count John IV of Katzenelnbogen, a German nobleman who was the first grower of Riesling grapes. This gold-plated lockable silver tankard is dated to c. 1420.

Glühwein is usually prepared from red wine, heated and spiced with cinnamon sticks, cloves, star aniseed, orange, sugar and at times vanilla pods. It is sometimes drunk mit Schuss (with a shot), which means that rum or some other liquor has been added. Fruit wines, such as blueberry wine and cherry wine, are occasionally used instead of grape wine in some parts of Germany. A variation of Glühwein is made with white wine, but it is less popular than its red counterpart. For children, the non-alcoholic Kinderpunsch is offered on Christmas markets, which is a punch with similar spices.

Another popular variant of Glühwein in Germany is Feuerzangenbowle. It shares the same recipe, but for this drink a rum-soaked sugarloaf is set on fire and allowed to drip into the wine.

Nordic glögg 

Glögg, gløgg, glögi and similar words are the terms used for mulled wine in the Nordic countries (sometimes spelled as glog or glug). It is spelled gløgg in Norwegian, Danish and Faroese, glögg in Swedish and Icelandic and glögi in Finnish and Estonian. In Denmark, Norway, Sweden and Finland gløgg or glögg is often drunk at Christmas events.

Non-alcoholic and alcoholic versions of glögg can be bought ready-made or prepared with fruit juices instead of wine. The main ingredients of alcoholic glögg are red wine, sugar, spices such as cinnamon, cardamom, ginger, cloves, and bitter orange, and optionally also stronger spirits such as vodka, akvavit, rum or brandy. Throughout Scandinavia, glögg spice extract and ready-mixed spices can be purchased in grocery stores. To prepare glögg, spices or spice extract are mixed into the wine, which is then heated to 60-70 °C. When preparing homemade glögg using spices, the hot mixture is allowed to infuse for at least an hour, often longer, and then reheated before serving. Ready-made wine glögg, as well as low- or non-alcoholic varieties, is normally sold at Systembolaget in Sweden, and in Alko in Finland, ready to heat and serve, and not in concentrate or extract form. Glögg is generally served with raisins, dried cloves, blanched almonds and ginger biscuits (gingerbread cookies), and is a popular hot drink during the Christmas season.

In Sweden, ginger bread and lussebullar (also called lussekatter), a type of sweet bun with saffron and raisins, are typically served on December 13 to celebrate Saint Lucia's Day . It is also traditionally served at the julbord, the Christmas version of the classic, Swedish buffet smörgåsbord. In Denmark, gløgg pairings typically include æbleskiver sprinkled with powdered sugar and accompanied with strawberry marmalade. In Norway, gløgg is paired with risengrynsgrøt (rice pudding). In such cases, the word graut-/grøtfest is more precise, taking the name from the rice pudding which is served as a course. Typically, gløgg is drunk before eating the rice pudding, which is often served with cold, red cordial (saus).

Glögg recipes vary widely; variations with white wine or sweet wine such as Port or Madeira, or spirits such as brandy, schnapps or whisky are also popular, either added directly or by soaking the raisins and spice in them before preparing the drink (often resulting in a notable increase in the alcohol contents). Glögg can also be made without alcohol by replacing the wine with fruit or berry juices (often blackcurrant) or by boiling the glögg to evaporate the alcohol. Glögg is similar in taste to modern Wassail or mulled cider.

Other countries 

In Croatia, Slovenia, Bosnia and Herzegovina, Montenegro and Serbia, kuhano vino or kuvano vino (lit. "cooked wine"), is made from red or white wine and various combinations of nutmeg, cloves, cinnamon, aniseed sugar/honey or orange zest, often served with slices of orange or lemon.  In North Macedonia, it is called vareno vino ("boiled wine") or greeno vino ("heated wine") and is usually served in late autumn or winter. It is made of red wine, usually from the Tikvešh region, combined with cinnamon and sugar or honey. The wine, heated in combination with pepper, is used as a folk remedy for cold and flu.

In the south and southeast of Brazil, where a large number of people of European descent live, it is called vinho quente or quentão, from the same Portuguese drink. It is typically made with red wine, cinnamon sticks and cloves. Cachaça may be added to increase the alcohol content. It is served as part of the Festa Junina, celebrated during winter in the month of June.

In Bulgaria, it is called greyano vino ("heated wine"), and consists of red wine, honey and peppercorn. Sometimes apples or citrus fruits, such as lemon or oranges, can be added.

In Chile, it is called candola in the south and vino navega'o in the north (navegado; lit. "sailor"; "navigated" is considered a hypercorrection). Navega'o is a hot drink made from red wine, orange peels, cinnamon sticks, cloves, and sugar. Although being considered a southern Chile beverage, it is served throughout the country. Many people regard it as a winter drink. Saint John's Eve (Spanish tradition which replaced Wetripantru, the Mapuche New Year's Day that coincides with the Winter Solstice in the southern hemisphere—Midsummer in the northern hemisphere) on the evening of 23 June would be, for example, a good time to drink navega'o.

In the Czech Republic, mulled wine is called svařené víno ("boiled wine"), colloquially svařák.  In Slovakia, mulled wine is called varené víno ("boiled wine"), and is usually served during the Christmas season.

In France, vin chaud ('hot wine') typically consists of red wine mixed with honey, cinnamon, and orange. It must not be too sweet. Beverage noted in the Alps for winter sports.  In Geneva, Switzerland, vin chaud is consumed during the festivities surrounding L'Escalade.

In Hungary, forralt bor ("boiled wine") is typically made from the country's popular Egri Bikavér and spiced with cinnamon, sugar and cloves. Sometimes Amaretto is added for extra taste.

In Italy, mulled wine is typical in the northern part of the country and is called vin brulé (from the French vin brûlé, "burnt wine", though the expression is not used in France).

In Latvia, it is called karstvīns ("hot wine"). When out of wine, it is prepared using grape (or currant) juice and Riga Black Balsam.  In Lithuania, it is called glintveinas or karštas vynas ("hot wine").

In Romania, vin fiert is typically made with cinnamon, sugar and oranges. Red wine is the most common type but white wine is also used.  In Moldova vin fiert is made from red wine with black pepper and honey.

In the Netherlands and Belgium, the drink is known as bisschopswijn ('bishop's wine'). Bisschopswijn is drunk during the Sinterklaas holidays.

In Poland, grzane wino  ("heated wine"), or grzaniec in highlander dialect, is very similar to the Czech variant, especially in the southern regions. There is also a similar method for preparing mulled beer, or grzane piwo, which is popular with Belgian beers because of the sweet flavor of that particular type of beer, which uses the same spices as mulled wine and is heated. Vodka-spiked mulled wine can be found in Polish Christmas markets, where mulled wine is used as a mixer.

In Portugal, mainly in the Douro and Minho Provinces, it is called vinho quente and made with Madeira wine and port wine, in the Porto region Porto Quente is more popular.

In Russia and Ukraine, glintveyn is a popular drink during winters and has same recipe as the German Glühwein. Additionally, the traditional Russian winter herbal drink sbiten, although usually a non-alcoholic tisane made with hot water, may also be made with red wine replacing some or all of the water.

See also

References

Bibliography 
 NPR Staff. "Get into the Holiday Spirit with Scandinavian Glogg". All Things Considered. NPR. 22 December 2011.

External links 

Chilean alcoholic drinks
Christmas food
Sinterklaas food
Halloween food
Hot drinks
Cocktails with wine
Wine styles
Wine dishes
Cocktails with eggs